The Jones-Haywood School of Ballet, now known as The Jones-Haywood Dance School, was founded in 1941 by Doris W. Jones and Claire Haywood in Washington D.C. to teach young dancers of color classical ballet.

Its students have gone on to dance with Alvin Ailey , Philadanco, Dutch National Ballet, The Washington Ballet, Paul Taylor Dance Company, on Broadway, and also become choreographers, actors and dance educators.  Famous alumni include Chita Rivera, Hinton Battle, Sylvester Campbell, Louis Johnson and Sandra Fortune-Green.

Jones and Haywood also founded the Capitol Ballet Company, a racially integrated professional ballet troupe that operated from 1961 to 1989.  The school was also home to the Jones-Haywood Dancers.

Haywood died in 1978 and Jones died in 2006.  The school is now directed by Sandra Fortune-Green.

References

External links 
Jones-Haywood School of Ballet http://www.joneshaywood.com/
The Historymakers Biography of Doris W. Jones http://www.thehistorymakers.com/biography/doris-jones-39
Washington Post article on Chita Rivera and Doris W. Jones https://www.washingtonpost.com/news/arts-and-entertainment/wp/2016/03/15/how-chita-rivera-keeps-dancing-at-83-with-16-screws-in-her-leg/

1941 establishments in Washington, D.C.
Ballet schools in the United States
Dance in Washington, D.C.